is a Japanese actor. He won the award for best supporting actor at the 23rd Japan Academy Prize for Poppoya.

Kobayashi signed with Toei in 1961 and started his acting career with small roles.

Filmography

Film

 Soshiki Bōryoku (1967)
 Female Prisoner 701: Scorpion (1971)
 Street Mobster (1972)
 Outlaw Killers: Three Mad Dog Brothersr (1972)
 New Battles Without Honor and Humanity: The Boss's Head (1975) : Shimura
 The Bullet Train (1975) : Morimoto
 Karate Warriors (1976) : Higashida
 The Classroom of Terror (1976) : Fumio Odagiri
 Yakuza Graveyard (1976) : Akira Kitajima
 The Doberman Cop (1977) ; Katsuo Koyama
 Hokuriku Proxy War (1977)
 Message from Space (1978) : Fox
 Shogun's Samurai (1978)
 Nihon no Fixer (1979) : Shunsuke Mizumaki
 Virus (1980)
 The Gate of Youth (1981)
 Eijanaika (1981) : Matakichi
 Station (1981) : Tatsumi
 Theater of Life (1983)
 The Ballad of Narayama (1983) : Tsune
  Shōsetsu Yoshida Gakkō (1983), Eiichi Nishimura
 The Geisha (1983)
 The Go Masters (1983), Takii
 Izakaya Chōji (1983) : Ozeki
 Seburi monogatari (1985)
 The Burmese Harp (1985)
 Lonely Heart (1985)
 Chōchin (1987)
 47 Ronin (1994) : Shindo Genshiro
 Poppoya (1999)
 The Twilight Samurai (2002)
 Café Lumière (2003)
 The Hidden Blade (2004)
 About Her Brother (2010)
 It All Began When I Met You (2013)
 Saraba Abunai Deka (2016)
 Hoshi Megumino Machi (2018) (First Lead role in the film)
 Impossibility Defense (2018)
 Tora-san, Wish You Were Here (2019)
 Labyrinth of Cinema (2020)
 It's a Flickering Life (2021)

Television
 Captain Ultra (1967)
Giant Robo (1967), Terroman (Episode 26)
 Pro Hunter (1981)
 Hanekonma (1986), Hiroshi (Hanekonma's father)
 Furuhata Ninzaburō (1994) (Episode 7)
 Hachidai Shōgun Yoshimune (1995), Kanō Hisamichi
 Oda Nobunaga: Tenka wo Totta Baka (1998), Hirate Masahide
 Tax Inspector Madogiwa Taro (1998-)
 Aoi (2000), Katagiri Katsumoto
 Yoshitsune (2005), Hōjō Tokimasa
 Detective Tokunosuke Jinbo (2007-2017)
 Shiroi Kyotō (2019)

References

1943 births
Living people
Japanese male film actors
Actors from Wakayama Prefecture
20th-century Japanese male actors
21st-century Japanese male actors